Coincya cintrana is a flowering plant of the family Brassicaceae. It is a hemicryptophyte plant, and it grows on walls, in steep areas and in rocky slopes. It flowers from April until June.

The species authority is (Cout.) P.Silva, and was published in Bol. Soc. Brot. sér. 2, 60: 153. 1987.

It is protected by Portuguese and European Union legislations, namely by the annex II and IV of the Habitats Directive.

Distribution
It's an endemic species from continental Portugal, namely from Serra de Sintra, Serra de Santo António and Serra de Montejunto.

Synonyms
The Plant List lists this species as a synonym of Coincya monensis subsp. cheiranthos (Vill.) C.Aedo Pérez, Leadlay & Muñoz Garm. In the Tropicos database, the accepted name is also the subspecies mentioned earlier.

EUNIS states that this species is a synonym of Rhynchosinapsis pseudoerucastrum subsp. cintrana.

References

Bibliography
 Checklist da Flora de Portugal (Continental, Açores e Madeira) - Sociedade Lusitana de Fitossociologia 
 Checklist da Flora do Arquipélago da Madeira (Madeira, Porto Santo, Desertas e Selvagens) - Grupo de Botânica da Madeira

External links

 Coincya cintrana - Flora-on 
 Coincya - Flora iberica
 Coincya cintrana - EUNIS
 Coincya cintrana - Biodiversity Heritage Library - Bibliography
 Coincya cintrana - ICN - Plano Sectorial da Rede Natura 2000

Flora of Portugal
cintrana
Endemic flora of Portugal
Endemic flora of the Iberian Peninsula